Traces of the Past is a 1950 Mexican drama film, directed by Alfredo B. Crevenna and starring Libertad Lamarque, alongside Emilia Guiú, José María Linares-Rivas and Xavier Loyá. The film's art direction was by Edward Fitzgerald. The film is considered one of Lamarque's "mother melodramas" that she made in Mexico.

Plot
Isabel (Libertad Lamarque) is a woman who left behind her career as a singer to marry lawyer Federico Montero (José María Linares-Rivas). Isabel's past as a singer torments Federico, who finds it immoral, and after an incident following Isabel's chance encounter with a former boyfriend, he leaves her, taking their son Raúl away from her. Years pass, and Isabel, who in the meantime reassumed her career as a singer as "Issa Valetti", upon learning of Federico's death, goes searching for Raúl. She eventually finds the now grown up Raúl (Xavier Loyá), who now has become a hard-drinking man who hates his mother despite having no memory of her, and is in a relationship with Amanda (Emilia Guiú), a gold-digger. With Raúl unaware about the relationship he has with Isabel (only knowing her as famous singer Issa Valetti), Isabel tries to change his mind about his mother, but to her dismay, she finds out that Raúl has fallen in love with her "Issa Valetti" persona.

Cast
 Libertad Lamarque as Isabel / Issa Valetti 
 Emilia Guiú as Amanda
 José María Linares-Rivas as Federico Montero
 Xavier Loyá as Adult Raúl
 Francisco Jambrina as Marcos 
 José Pidal as Vázquez, impresario 
 Alejandro Ciangherotti as Antonio Quintero	
 María Gentil Arcos as Lupe, nanny
 Amparo Arozamena as Pepita
 Meneses y Francioli
 Victorio Blanco as Theater man (uncredited)
 Gloria Cansino as Theater employee (uncredited)
 Elisa Christy as Gloria (uncredited)
 Álvaro Matute as Theater employee (uncredited)
 Roberto Meyer as Police Commissioner (uncredited)
 Nicolás Rodríguez Jr. as Child Raúl (uncredited)
 Rafael Torres as Carlo (uncredited)
 Acela Vidaurri as Theater employee (uncredited)

References

External links
 

1950 films
1950s Spanish-language films
1950 drama films
Mexican drama films
Films directed by Alfredo B. Crevenna
Films scored by Manuel Esperón
Mexican black-and-white films
1950s Mexican films